A concert tour (or simply tour) is a series of concerts by an artist or group of artists in different cities, countries or locations.  Often, concert tours are named to differentiate different tours by the same artist and to associate a specific tour with a particular album or product.  Especially in the popular music world, such tours can become large-scale enterprises that last for several months or even years, are seen by hundreds of thousands or millions of people, and bring in millions of dollars in ticket revenues. A performer who embarks on a concert tour is called a touring artist.

Different segments of longer concert tours are known as "legs". The different legs of a tour are denoted in different ways, dependent on the artist and type of tour, but the most common means of separating legs are dates (especially if there is a long break at some point), countries and/or continents, or different opening acts.  In the largest concert tours, it has become more common for different legs to employ separate touring production crews and equipment, local to each geographical region.  Concert tours are often administered on the local level by concert promoters or by performing arts presenters. Usually, small concert tours are managed by a road manager whereas large concert tours are managed by a tour manager.

Logistics

The main challenge in concert tours is how to move the performance's logistics from one venue to another venue, especially for a transcontinental tour. Tour logistics should be very organized and everything has to happen on time and in the right order as planned. Autoweek magazine estimated 30 to 50 trucks were required by Taylor Swift's The 1989 World Tour to bring all the stage, sound equipment, instruments, props, and clothes. When Beyoncé visited the United Kingdom with her 2016 The Formation World Tour, it took seven Boeing 747 air freighters and a fleet of more than 70 trucks to get her stage set and other gear to the venues. The logistics phase of that tour didn't include transportation of the backstage staff, musicians, performers, and the singer herself.

Themes

The majority of concert tours are part of a promotional campaign to support an album release. Hence, new songs from the respective album are included on its tour's setlist. Some tours are known as "greatest hits tours" or "reunion tour" without any new material or specific album release, such as Fleetwood Mac's 2009 Unleashed tour and No Doubt's 2009 Summer Tour. In another case, artists embark on a concert tour to celebrate the anniversary of their past albums, such as U2's 2017 tour to mark the 30th anniversary of The Joshua Tree (1987) and Janet Jackson's 2019 tour to commemorate the 30th anniversary of Janet Jackson's Rhythm Nation 1814 (1989).

Farewell tour

A farewell tour is a concert tour intended to signal the retirement of a singer, a disbanding of a band, or the end of a show's run. Many of the tours end up not being the last tour, with frequent regroupings, or revivals of shows. Luciano Pavarotti's 2004 tour and Kenny Rogers's 2015–2017 tour are examples of farewell tours which were the last to be staged before their deaths.

Revenue

, the highest-grossing concert tour of all time is Elton John's Farewell Yellow Brick Road, which is an ongoing tour from 2018 to 2023, with a gross revenue so far of $817.9 million. In second place is Ed Sheeran's ÷ Tour, with a gross of $776.2 million. The third-highest-grossing concert tour of all time is U2's 360° Tour, which earned approximately $736 million between 2009 and 2011. Madonna's Sticky & Sweet Tour, which earned $408 million in 2008 and 2009, was the highest-earning tour by a female artist. According to the 2014 report from Billboard Boxscore, five acts made over US$1 billion in touring since 1990: The Rolling Stones, U2, Bruce Springsteen, Madonna and Bon Jovi.

Global touring revenue reported to Billboard Boxscore exceeded $5.5 billion in 2016. Due to the collapse of record sales in the 21st century, concert tours have become a major income for recording artists. Besides the tickets, touring also generates money from the sales of merchandise and meet-and-greet packages. However, the touring business suffered in the early 2020s because of the COVID-19 pandemic. Pollstar estimated the total lost revenue for the industry in 2020 at more than $30 billion.

Response
The mobility of concert tours requires a lot of costs, time, and energy. It is very common for musicians to not see family members for over a year during their touring. British singer Adele expressed her unhappiness of concert tours, saying "Touring is a peculiar thing, it doesn't suit me particularly well. I'm a real homebody and I get so much joy in the small things." A concert residency concept is offered as an alternative to performers who just need to stay in one venue and the fans come to see them. The concept has been revitalized in the 21st century by Canadian superstar Céline Dion with the success of her A New Day... residency (2003–2007). Her residency introduced a new form of theatrical entertainment, a fusion of song, performance art, innovative stage craft, and state-of-the-art technology. She managed to popularize the Las Vegas residency as a desirable way for top artists to essentially tour in place, letting their fans come to them.  American singer Lady Gaga, who cancelled the 2018 European leg of her Joanne World Tour, signed for a Las Vegas residency to help manage her fibromyalgia illness, which can be exacerbated by touring.

The 2015 study by charity Help Musicians found that over 60% of musicians suffered from depression or other psychological issues, with touring an issue for 71% of respondents.

See also
 Lists of concert tours

References

External links

Billboard touring news

 
Music performance